Caelostomus explanatus is a species of ground beetle in the subfamily Pterostichinae. It was described by Henry Walter Bates in 1888.

References

Caelostomus
Beetles described in 1888